Gull Natorp (10 January 1880 – 30 April 1962) was a Swedish film actress. She appeared in more than 70 films between 1913 and 1956.

Selected filmography

 Skottet (1914) - Maid
 Hans hustrus förflutna (1915) - Countess Flemming
 Erotikon (1920) - Spectator at the Opera
 A Fortune Hunter (1921) - Mrs. Margarete Grijp
 A Wild Bird (1921) - Guest
 Thomas Graal's Ward (1922) - Lady with piano
 Kalle Utter (1925) - Prostinna
 A Perfect Gentleman (1927)
 Frida's Songs (1930) - Post clerk (uncredited)
 Markurells i Wadköping (1931) - Member of the board (uncredited)
 What Do Men Know? (1933) - Mrs. Holm
 En stilla flirt (1934) - Mrs. Wilder (uncredited)
 Kärlek efter noter (1935) - Mrs. Tranman
 Kungen kommer (1936) - Adele Löwencreutz
 Pappas pojke (1937) - Mrs. Fanny Hellman
 Du gamla du fria! (1938) - Ellen
 Då länkarna smiddes (1939) - Anna Björnberg, hans hustru
 Between Us Barons (1939) - Tant Victoria
 The Bjorck Family (1940) - Tant Inga
 Snurriga familjen (1940) - Mrs. Augusta Welander (uncredited)
 A Real Man (1940) - Mrs. Betty Bergström
 Bright Prospects (1941) - Mrs. Norrman
 Nygifta (1941) - Mrs. Gunersen
 How to Tame a Real Man (1941) - Miss Beate-Sophie Gripclou
 Lärarinna på vift (1941) - Miss Bruuhn
 Hem från Babylon (1941) - Britta's mother (uncredited)
 The Yellow Clinic (1942) - Nurse Dagmar
 Rospiggar (1942) - Stava, hans hustru
 Adventurer (1942) - Helena Daa
 Ombyte av tåg (1943) - Rut Lundell, Kim's Mother (uncredited)
 Flickan är ett fynd (1943) - Wilhelmina Fogelström
 Little Napoleon (1943) - Aunt Anna
 Life and Death (1943) - Mrs. Lewen
 A Girl for Me (1943) - Lord Mayoress
 I dag gifter sig min man (1943) - Aunt Ottilia
 In Darkest Smaland (1943) - Kristin
 Life in the Country (1943) - Mrs. Berger
 Skipper Jansson (1944) - Mrs. Westerlund
 The Girl and the Devil (1944) - Woman Being Forced to Buy a Skirt
 Prince Gustaf (1944) - Malla Silverstolpe
 Fram för lilla Märta eller På livets ödesvägar (1945) - Borgmästarinnan Granlund född Riddarsporre
 Rattens musketörer (1945) - Martha Berg
 13 stolar (1945) - Hostess
 Kristin Commands (1946) - Hanna - Deaf Lady (uncredited)
 Saltstänk och krutgubbar (1946) - Johanna
 Iris and the Lieutenant (1946) - Mrs. Asp
 Dynamite (1947) - Dean's Wife
 The Girl from the Marsh Croft (1947) - Fortuneteller (uncredited)
 En fluga gör ingen sommar (1947) - Fru Andersson
 Crime in the Sun (1947) - Cleaning Lady (uncredited)
 Får jag lov, magistern! (1947) - Mrs. Pilgård
 Var sin väg (1948) - Gabrielle Collin
 Med kärlek och solsken och sång (1948) - Woman of Morality
 A Swedish Tiger (1948) - Klara
 Robinson in Roslagen (1948) - Katrina
 The Devil and the Smalander (1949) - Gustava
 Playing Truant (1949) - Mrs. Agda Carlsson
 The Swedish Horseman (1949) - Countess Gyllencrona
 Teacher's First Born (1950) - Betty Mosch
 Fiancée for Hire (1950) - Countess Rosenskiöld
 The White Cat (1950) - Otti Patkull
 One Fiancée at a Time (1952) - Fru Stockman
 The Firebird (1952) - Tilda
 Unmarried Mothers (1953) - Elna, Inga's Supervisor
 The Girl from Backafall (1953) - Vicar's wife (uncredited)
 The Shadow (1953) - Woman
 Kungen av Dalarna (1953) - Katarina
 Dance, My Doll (1953) - Mrs. Uggla
 Our Father and the Gypsy (1954) - Rakel Demant
 En karl i köket (1954) - Mrs. X
 Uncle's (1955) - Landlady
 Whoops! (1955) - Beda
 Getting Married (1955) - Colonel's wife (uncredited)
 Smiles of a Summer Night (1955) - Malla
 The Stranger from the Sky (1956) - Actress
 Stage Entrance (1956) - Woman (uncredited)

References

External links

 

1880 births
1962 deaths
Swedish film actresses
Swedish silent film actresses
Actresses from Stockholm
20th-century Swedish actresses